Christopher Grant Wood (born 7 December 1991) is a New Zealand professional footballer who plays as a forward for Nottingham Forest, on loan from fellow  club Newcastle United, and the New Zealand national team. 

Wood started his senior career with Cambridge FC, Waikato FC and Hamilton Wanderers before moving to England to play for Premier League club West Bromwich Albion. He spent his time on loan to six different clubs before joining Leicester City in 2013. After a loan spell with Ipswich Town in 2015, he signed for Championship club Leeds United where he became top scorer in the 2016–17 season. Wood then joined Burnley for a club record fee, and became a consistent goalscorer for them in the Premier League, notching up 49 goals in 144 matches over four-and-a-half seasons.

Wood has been capped 70 times for the New Zealand national team and scored 33 goals, making him the all-time record leading goalscorer for his country. He played for the team at the 2010 FIFA World Cup, and was part of the squad that won the 2016 OFC Nations Cup.

Early and personal life
Wood was born in Auckland to Grant and Julie Wood; his mother is from England. Wood began his footballing career at Onehunga Sports; after moving to Hamilton aged 11, he attended St Paul's Collegiate School.

He is the brother of Chelsey Wood, who is also an accomplished footballer. She represented New Zealand under 20s at the 2008 U20 Women's World Cup in Chile and the 2010 U20 Women's World Cup in Germany. As of October 2018, Wood was in a relationship with Kirsty Linnett who is also a professional footballer.

Club career

Early career
Wood began his senior career with Cambridge FC, scoring on his debut in the NRFL Division 2 in 2006 aged just 14, and after a spell at local rivals Hamilton Wanderers the following season in the NRFL Premier, he attracted the attention of ASB Premiership club Waikato FC.

West Bromwich Albion
Wood was recommended to West Bromwich Albion's Academy by coach Roger Wilkinson, who set up a trial for him. He found a rich vein of goal scoring form for West Brom's youth academy side, leading to a call-up to the reserve team where he was just as prolific. Injuries to several West Brom players saw Wood handed a surprise call up to the first-team for a Premier League match against Portsmouth at Fratton Park in April 2009. He came on as a substitute to become just the fifth New Zealander to play in the Premier League.

At the end of the 2008–09 season, Wood signed his first professional contract, of two years with a further two-year option in the club's favour. This was followed in December 2009 with a new three and a half-year deal, with West Brom having the option to extend that for a further year. He scored his first professional goal for West Brom on 15 September 2009, a "stunning" 25-yard strike into the top left corner, in a 3–1 win over Doncaster Rovers.

Loan spells
Wood was sent out on a 93-day emergency loan to Barnsley on 24 September 2010. The loan was terminated early by mutual consent after seven league appearances for the club without scoring.

On 19 November, Wood signed for Brighton & Hove Albion on loan until January 2011. He scored on his debut against Bristol Rovers but saw a penalty saved just days later against Southampton. He added to his scoring tally in the 3–1 FA Cup win over Portsmouth, and scored twice against Peterborough United.

The day before the first match of the Championship season, Wood joined Birmingham City on a one-month loan. He made his debut the following day, replacing Keith Fahey in the second half of a 2–1 defeat at Derby County. Playing as the lone striker in Birmingham's first match in major European competition for nearly 50 years, the Europa League play-off round first leg against Portuguese club Nacional, Wood hit the frame of the goal twice. The game finished goalless. He scored his first goal for Birmingham in the second leg of the tie against Nacional. On 11 September, Wood scored a hat-trick to lead Birmingham to victory over Millwall, followed by two goals against Nottingham Forest on 2 October to take his league total to seven goals from eight games. His loan was then extended for a second time, until 5 January 2012. His eighth, to clinch a 2–0 win over Leicester City, came when Marlon King played a cross-field ball for Wood to run on to and, according to The Independent, "the composure he revealed to go past Kasper Schmeichel and slot the ball home from an angle was impressive". Four days later, Wood scored in the 10th minute of stoppage time to defeat Club Brugge 2–1 in the Europa League group stage. His loan ended on 5 January 2012, after 29 games in all competitions from which he scored 11 goals.

After returning to West Bromwich Albion as an unused substitute in their third round FA Cup tie against Cardiff City, Wood joined Championship club Bristol City on loan until the end of the 2011–12 season. He scored three goals during his loan spell with the club, his first goal coming on his home debut in a 2–1 win over Doncaster Rovers on 21 January. His other two goals came in back to back matches, one against Nottingham Forest on 7 April, where it was the only goal of the game, and then two days later at home to Coventry City in a 3–1 win.

On 17 September 2012, Wood completed a two-month loan deal to Championship side Millwall. He made his Millwall debut as a substitute for Darius Henderson against Cardiff City, and on his first start, scored a consolation goal against his former club Brighton & Hove Albion. On 18 November, Wood extended his loan until January 2013, and scored the winner against Leeds United on the same day. On 24 November, he scored the opening goal away to Blackburn Rovers, a powerful shot from 25 yards, helping the visitors to a 2–0 victory.

Leicester City

West Bromwich Albion recalled Wood from Millwall on 27 December 2012, and announced the following day that they had accepted offers from Millwall and fellow Championship club Leicester City for the permanent transfer of Wood. He chose to join the latter, and the move was expected to be completed when the January 2013 transfer window opens. Leicester confirmed that the player had agreed personal terms. Wood started and scored twice after only 24 minutes in his first game for Leicester on 1 January 2013 against Huddersfield Town, initially joining on loan to be registered in time to play.

On 12 January 2013, Wood scored a first-half hat-trick against Bristol City at Ashton Gate to take his goal tally to six goals in three games for Leicester. He finished the regular season with 11 goals in 24 appearances, helping Leicester qualify for the Championship play-offs. On 12 May 2013, Wood played in the semi-final second leg against Watford but the team were knocked out by the opposition 3–2 on aggregate.

On 26 March 2014, TV footage appeared to support Leicester goalkeeper Kasper Schmeichel's claim that he had scored what would have been the first goal of his career, when Leicester equalised in injury time against Yeovil Town. However, the match officials ruled that his header had not crossed the line, and the goal was officially credited to Wood, who followed up to put the ball in the net. Five days later, after replacing Jamie Vardy as a substitute, Wood scored a "stunning" long-range volley against Burnley to put Leicester six points clear at the top of the Championship. Wood finished the season with 8 goals in all competitions as Leicester were promoted to the Premier League at the end of the season as champions.

On 16 August 2014, he came on for Leonardo Ulloa after 78 minutes of Leicester's first match of the Premier League season, at home to Everton. Seven minutes later he scored the equaliser in a 2–2 draw.

On 27 February 2015, Wood joined Ipswich Town on loan until the end of the season. He made his debut for Ipswich against Norwich City on 1 March, playing eight matches for them without scoring. However, on 25 April, he was recalled by his parent club during their successful fight to avoid relegation from the Premier League.

Leeds United
As a result, he became Leeds' most expensive signing since the arrival of Nick Barmby in August 2002. Wood was given the number 9 shirt for the coming season. On 8 August, the opening day of the season, Wood made his debut for Leeds in the Championship in a 1–1 draw against Burnley. Four days later, Wood missed his attempt in a penalty shoot-out against Doncaster Rovers in the League Cup, with Leeds losing the shoot-out 4–2 after a 1–1 draw. Wood scored his first goal for Leeds on 19 August in a 2–2 draw with Bristol City. Near the end of the season, he scored his 13th goal of the season on 7 May 2016 against Preston North End in a 1–1 draw to finish as his club's top goal scorer for the 2015–16 season.

Wood scored his first goal of the following season on 10 August 2016, in their League Cup fixture against Fleetwood Town, and his first league goal was an injury-time equaliser a week later with a bicycle kick in a 1–1 draw with Fulham. He scored again in the next match, as Leeds beat Sheffield Wednesday 2–0, and by the end of September had seven goals in all competitions. His ninth goal of the season came in extra time of the League Cup fourth-round tie against Norwich to make the score 2–2, and he converted his kick as Leeds won in a penalty shoot-out. He opened the scoring against Reading in mid-December, but had to leave the field in the first half with what proved to be a minor hamstring injury.

Wood's 16th goal of the season, in a 1–0 win against Derby County on 13 January, sent Leeds third in the Championship table. A week later, he scored twice in a 3–2 defeat against Barnsley; this was the first time that Leeds had lost a match in which Wood had scored. He reached 20 for the season on 25 January in a 2–0 win over Nottingham Forest that returned Leeds to third in the table, and continued to score regularly, although Leeds were unable to maintain their playoff position. His last goal of the season, a penalty to equalise in a 1–1 draw with Wigan Athletic, took him to 30 goals in all competitions, and his 27 in the league made him the Championship top scorer.

Wood won the EFL Championship Player of the Month award for January 2017, and was voted PFA Fans' Championship Player of the Month for both January and March. He was shortlisted for Championship Player of the Season, but lost out to Brighton's Anthony Knockaert. Wood and teammate Pontus Jansson were named in the EFL Championship Team of the Season and the EFL (all divisions) Team of the Season, and Wood was the only Leeds player selected for the PFA Championship Team of the Year. At club level, he won Leeds United's Player of the Year and Players' Player of the Year awards for 2016–17.

On 6 August 2017, Wood scored his first goal of the season in the 3–2 victory against Bolton Wanderers. On 18 August, after the club had rejected a £12 million offer from Premier League club Burnley earlier in the week, Leeds offered Wood a new three-year contract in an attempt to keep him at the club. In the expectation of a further, successful, bid, he ruled himself out of the match against Sunderland on 19 August.

Burnley
On 21 August 2017, Wood signed a four-year contract with Premier League club Burnley for an undisclosed club-record fee, widely reported as £15 million. Wood made his Burnley debut on 27 August against Tottenham Hotspur at Wembley Stadium in the Premier League, and scored an equaliser in the second minute of stoppage time in a match which finished 1–1.

On 19 September, in the EFL Cup third round, Wood scored against his former club Leeds United at Turf Moor in the 89th minute from the penalty spot. The match ended 2–2 after extra time, and Leeds won the match 5–3 on penalties. On 8 November 2019, Wood signed a new contract committing himself to Burnley until 2023.

Wood scored in the final match of the 2019–20 season in Burnley's 2–1 defeat to Brighton on 26 July 2020. It was his 14th goal of the season, both his highest return in the Premier League and best scoring season overall in a Burnley shirt.

On 6 March 2021, Wood scored his 40th goal in the Premier League in a 1–1 draw against Arsenal, as well as becoming the eighth player in the history of the club who has started 100 Premier League games for Burnley. On 25 April, he scored his first hat-trick for Burnley in a 4–0 away league win against Wolverhampton Wanderers, becoming the first New Zealander to score three goals in a Premier League match.

Newcastle United
On 13 January 2022, Wood signed a two-and-a-half-year contract with Newcastle United for a fee reported to be £25 million, after his release clause was triggered. Newcastle manager Eddie Howe said that Wood was an important signing at a crucial time of the season. Wood himself saw the move as an "exciting opportunity" after becoming the club's second signing since the takeover from a Saudi-backed consortium. He made his Newcastle debut two days after signing when he started in a 1–1 draw against Watford, and his first goal for the club was the equaliser in a 2–1 league win over Southampton on 10 March. 

Wood found his first-team chances at Newcastle limited, and on 20 January 2023, he joined Premier League club Nottingham Forest on loan to the end of the season. The deal included an obligation to buy should certain conditions be met. His first goal, an 84th-minute tap-in, earned Forest a draw at home to Manchester City on 18 February.

International career

Wood represented New Zealand at under-17 level and was a standout performer for the All Whites at the 2007 FIFA U-17 World Cup, a tournament which earned him a trial with English football club West Bromwich Albion, for whom he later signed.

After a string of impressive performances at club level, Wood's rise on the international stage continued as he was fast-tracked into All Whites coach Ricki Herbert's squad for the 2009 FIFA Confederations Cup in South Africa, and made his debut in a friendly against Tanzania on 3 June 2009 in a warm up match to the tournament.

In May 2010, Wood was named in the All Whites World Cup squad for the 2010 FIFA World Cup, and at 18 was the youngest member of the New Zealand team which travelled to South Africa. He came on as a substitute in the first group match in a 1–1 draw against Slovakia as New Zealand claimed their first ever point in a World Cup finals match. He appeared as a substitute in New Zealand's remaining group matches, a 1–1 draw with Italy and a 0–0 draw with Paraguay, as they were knocked out of the tournament after drawing all three group games.

Wood scored his first international goal on 10 October 2010 in his country's 1–1 draw with Honduras. He was given a yellow card for the unusual nature of his celebration of the goal, where he revealed his underwear to the spectators.

Wood scored his first international hat-trick against Solomon Islands on 10 June 2012 in the 3rd/4th play-off of the OFC Nations Cup. He was named in the New Zealand under-23s squad for the 2012 Olympics, and scored in a 1–1 draw against Egypt under-23's on 29 July 2012 at Old Trafford. He also started the final group game in a 3–0 defeat to Brazil under-23s which saw the New Zealand Olympic squad knocked out of the tournament.

On 14 November 2014, Wood became the youngest ever captain for the All Whites, a record previously held by Tommy Smith.

He scored four goals in the 2016 OFC Nations Cup for New Zealand, helping them win the tournament and to qualify for the Confederations Cup.

With Wood being his country's vice-captain, in the absence of captain Winston Reid, he captained his country twice during November 2016, both against New Caledonia, first in a 3–0 victory on 12 November, and then in a 0–0 draw three days later. After being selected as captain for the 2017 FIFA Confederations Cup, Wood scored his only goal of the tournament on 21 June in a 2–1 defeat against Mexico.

Wood was named as one of the three overage players to participate in the 2020 Summer Olympics in Tokyo, Japan.

In March 2022, after scoring twice during New Zealand's 4–0 win over Fiji at the 2022 FIFA World Cup qualifiers in Qatar, Wood became the men's leading goal scorer with 30 goals, overtaking the previous record of 29, held by Vaughan Coveny since 25 May 2006.

Career statistics

Club

International

Scores and results list New Zealand's goal tally first, score column indicates score after each Wood goal.

Honours
West Bromwich Albion
Football League Championship runner-up: 2009–10

Brighton & Hove Albion
Football League One: 2010–11

Leicester City
Football League Championship: 2013–14

New Zealand
OFC Nations Cup: 2016

Individual
New Zealand U-20 Men's Player of the Year: 2008, 2009, 2011
IFFHS OFC Best Man Player of the Decade 2011–2020
EFL Team of the Season: 2016–17
EFL Championship Golden Boot: 2016–17
Football League Championship Player of the Month: January 2017
PFA Team of the Year: 2016–17 Championship
Leeds United Player of the Year: 2016–17
IFFHS OFC Men's Team of the Decade 2011–2020
IFFHS Oceania Men's Team of All Time: 2021
Burnley Player of the Year: 2020–21

Notes

References

External links

Profile at the Nottingham Forest F.C. website
Profile at the Newcastle United F.C. website

1991 births
Living people
Association footballers from Auckland
New Zealand association footballers
Association football forwards
Waikato FC players
West Bromwich Albion F.C. players
Barnsley F.C. players
Brighton & Hove Albion F.C. players
Birmingham City F.C. players
Bristol City F.C. players
Millwall F.C. players
Leicester City F.C. players
Ipswich Town F.C. players
Leeds United F.C. players
Burnley F.C. players
Newcastle United F.C. players
Nottingham Forest F.C. players
Premier League players
English Football League players
New Zealand youth international footballers
New Zealand under-23 international footballers
Olympic association footballers of New Zealand
New Zealand international footballers
2009 FIFA Confederations Cup players
2010 FIFA World Cup players
2012 OFC Nations Cup players
Footballers at the 2012 Summer Olympics
2016 OFC Nations Cup players
2017 FIFA Confederations Cup players
Footballers at the 2020 Summer Olympics
New Zealand expatriate association footballers
Expatriate footballers in England
New Zealand expatriate sportspeople in England
People educated at St Paul's Collegiate School
New Zealand people of English descent